The Pyakupur is a river in Yamalo-Nenets Autonomous Okrug, Russia, the left source river of the Pur. The length of the Pyakupur is 542 km. The area of its basin is 31,400 km2. There are approximately 32,600 lakes in the river basin. The main tributaries: Vyngypur (right) and Purpe (left). The river's peak month of discharge is June. The average discharge of water 290 m3/s.

See also
List of rivers of Russia

References

Rivers of Yamalo-Nenets Autonomous Okrug